George Willard Pummel (November 25, 1926 - July 2, 2016) was an American politician in the state of South Dakota. He was a member of the South Dakota House of Representatives from 1997 to 2002. A retired banker, Pummel is an alumnus of the University of Colorado and University of South Dakota. He is also a former mayor of Belle Fourche, South Dakota, and Deadwood, South Dakota.

References

2016 deaths
South Dakota Republicans
1926 births
People from Kidder County, North Dakota
People from Belle Fourche, South Dakota
Mayors of places in South Dakota
People from Deadwood, South Dakota